The 2013–14 Northern Counties East Football League season was the 32nd in the history of Northern Counties East Football League, a football competition in England.

Hucknall Town were originally due to play in the Premier Division but it was announced on 9 July 2013 that they had decided to withdraw due to financial reasons, instead deciding to join the Central Midlands Football League.

Premier Division

The Premier Division featured 19 clubs which competed in the previous season, along with four new clubs.
Clubs promoted from Division One:
Albion Sports
Athersley Recreation
Plus:
Basford United, promoted from the East Midlands Counties League
Garforth Town, relegated from the Northern Premier League
From this league, seven teams - Basford United, Bridlington Town, Brighouse Town, Retford United, Tadcaster Albion, Thackley and Worksop Parramore - applied for promotion.

At the end of the season Worksop Parramore merged with Handsworth at the end of the season to form Handsworth Parramore

League table

Results

Locations

Division One

Division One featured 19 clubs which competed in the previous season, along with three new clubs:
 Dronfield Town, promoted from the Central Midlands League
 Hall Road Rangers, relegated from the Premier Division
 Shaw Lane Aquaforce, promoted from the Sheffield and Hallamshire County Senior Football League

League table

Results

League Cup

The 2013–14 Northern Counties East Football League League Cup is the 32nd season of the league cup competition of the Northern Counties East Football League.

Calendar

Preliminary round

In the preliminary round, 12 teams from the Division One have been drawn together.

First round

The six clubs which made it through the preliminary round enter into the draw with the remaining 10 teams from Division One.

Second round

The 16 winners from the first round are joined by 22 of the clubs from the Premier Division. Long Eaton United received a bye to the third round after Hucknall Town resigned from the league after the draw had been made.

Third round

Fourth round

Semi-finals

League Cup Final
Match played at Bradford City's ground.

References

External links
 Northern Counties East Football League

2013-14
9